The Thames is one of the main rowing rivers in Europe. Several annual competitions are held along its course, including the Henley Royal Regatta, the The Boat Race and other long-distance events, called Head of the River races (Heads).

As well as the events held on the river itself, there are other, purpose-built rowing facilities along the course of the river, such as Dorney Lake between Slough and Windsor, Berkshire, which was a  2012 Summer Olympic venue and is now an international Cup, standard-distance rowing lake hosting the three main annual entry regattas for Henley: still named Marlow (International), Wallingford and Metropolitan. Other rowing lakes near the Thames are the Redgrave Pinsent Rowing Lake between Reading and Henley used by the Great Britain squad and Royal Albert Dock near North Woolwich, London.

History
Rowing races on the River Thames have been documented as early as 1725, and the Thames was the venue for the 1908 London Olympics rowing races.

Contemporary events, groups and modern history
The sport and recreational/touring rowing takes place on the Tideway and on the 45 separate lock reaches on the non-tidal section. 

The river hosts a televised succession of races on which bets are placed – traditionally named The Boat Race and for some decades a men-only event – it is now the (Oxford and Cambridge) Men's and Women's Boat Race on the cusp of March and April. Further inland the river hosts a tournament week of racing: Henley Royal Regatta which culminates the first weekend of July. 

It is on the long, tidal course of the Boat Race, the Championship Course, that at least 12 head of the river races are held every year – including the Head of the River Race which is the weekend before the Boat Race, attracting hundreds of racing shell eights. Head races are, by definition, long time trials. Twice as many heads are held on long, narrower reaches of the canalised inland river. Many clubs and a few schools and village fair committees as far inland as Oxford host shorter races – regattas – in warmer months. 

Event-raced, self-propelled boats on the Thames chiefly comprise (Olympic) racing shells.  Most events are for racing shells.

Traditional rowing boats
A Thames, or English, punt is a long slender vessel.  It sees very few and often intermittent or extremely local races.  Its use is almost wholly recreational.   (Thames) skiffs are the mainstay of several regattas and six extant clubs (see below).  A large version with a canvas is called a camping skiff, featuring in major modern travelogues and historically in Three Men in a Boat, published in 1889, a humorous account by English writer Jerome K. Jerome of a two-week boating holiday on this river from Kingston upon Thames to Oxford and back to Kingston. Other rowing typically takes place in dragon boats, dongolas, dinghies, inflatable rafts and larger skiffs known as cutters.

Regattas

Thames rowing regattas are almost all between April and the first week of September. All but the most prestigious are considered short. They are raced side-by-side. They are in categories for competitors and boat types: each consists of heats (mostly knock-out tournaments, that is, without repechages) and final. Many regatta days are split into two or more divisions so that competitors can enter two categories – such as a large and small boat, sweep-oar or sculling. Where category events have a cup it belongs to the regatta and is sometimes engraved with winners' club or composite clubs' name (or engraved on metal set around a plinth or set of plinths). Winners receive a medal – or tankard, called by rowers a "pot". A regatta in racing shell rowing has umpires/stewards who enforce preparedness (race registration, safety and marshalling time/location rules), false start and lane rules using a motor launch and the wearing of club kit.

"General" refers to a mix of skiffing, cutters, dinghies and other rowed craft.

Head of the River and long-distance events

Head of the River races (Heads) and other long-distance events dominate the winter months, and are usually processional (time trials): competitors set off at time intervals, and results are on the basis of comparative timing or by bumping (catching up the boat in front). Many of them on the Tideway are raced over The Championship Course, and apart from the Boat Race and Wingfield Sculls, may begin from Mortlake (west) or Putney (east) whichever tide matches the middle of the day or other central racing hours.

Other events

The Boat Race
Women's Boat Race
Henley Boat Races
Doggett's Coat and Badge
Great River Race

Clubs

Rowing on the river is generally organised through clubs based on the Thames, which include the following.

Competing many times per year

Universities 
 
Imperial College Boat Club 
Imperial College School of Medicine Boat Club 
Kingston Student Rowing Club  (formerly Kingston University Boat Club )
Oxford Brookes University Boat Club 
Oxford University Boat Club 
Reading University Boat Club 
University of London Boat Club 
King's College London Boat Club
Queen Mary, University of London Boat Club  
University College London Boat Club

Schools

References

Bibliography
As to currently competing clubs:
The Umpires' Handbook British Rowing, 2020: pp. 47–52.

 
Rowing competitions
Sport on the River Thames